Elizabeth Spencer is the name of:

Elizabeth Spencer (writer) (1921–2019), American novelist
Elizabeth Spencer (soprano) (1871–1935), American soprano, recording artist for Thomas Alva Edison
Lady Elizabeth Spencer (1737–1831), wife of Henry Herbert, 10th Earl of Pembroke
Elizabeth Spencer, Baroness Hunsdon (1552–1618), English noblewoman, scholar, and patron of the arts

Characters 
Elizabeth Webber, fictional character on the American soap opera General Hospital -- at one time married to Lucky Spencer
Betty Spencer, fictional character in Some Mothers Do 'Ave 'Em